Brisbane State High School (BSHS or often commonly State High) is a partially selective, co-educational, state secondary school, located in South Brisbane, Queensland, Australia. It is a member of the Great Public Schools Association of Queensland, and the Queensland Girls' Secondary Schools Sports Association. It was the first state secondary school established in Brisbane, as well as the first academic state high school to be founded in Queensland. The school employs a variety of selection criteria for prospective students, maintaining a quota for local area enrolments, however also using academic, sporting, cultural and artistic talents as means of determining the annual intake.

One of the school's buildings, H Block, was the former Brisbane South Girls and Infants School built in 1864 and is now listed on the Queensland Heritage Register.

History

T. Max Hawkins, historian and author of "The Queensland Great Public Schools – A History", wrote of the origins of Brisbane State High School, that:
The school developed from the School of Arts in Ann Street, and later from the old Normal School which was built by convict labour on the site where the State Government Insurance building now stands...The year 1913 is generally taken as the start of the Brisbane State High School, a co-educational school which, by 1964, had expanded to accommodate 1310 students, 891 of them boys.

Further light on the origins of the schools is shed in Philip Walker Davidson's work, "Great Public Schools : an investigation into G.P.S. secondary schooling in Queensland, its relationship with and the problem it poses architecture, and an appraisal of the factors governing the future establishment of such a school", where he wrote:
Headmasters of various metropolitan state schools were asked to nominate 76 boys and girls for admission to the new school, and a further 70 paying students made up the first year's enrolment. Classrooms were provided in the Technical College buildings, Ann Street, until 1914 when the school moved to lower George Street.

...in 1921 the school was to occupy the well known Normal School buildings on the corner of Adelaide and Edward Streets...At about this stage it was separated from the control of the Central Technical College and combined with the Junior High School which had been operating as a secondary department at the Normal School. The name Brisbane State High School was then first applied.

Although the school's beginning is taken as having been 1913, it was relocated to its current campus next to Musgrave Park at South Brisbane in 1925. The laying of the foundation stone of the "Red Brick Building", later designated A Block, took place in 1923 in the attendance of Queensland Education Minister John Huxham, and William Forgan Smith, then Queensland Minister for Public Works and later Premier.

Mr Isaac Waddle, the Brisbane State High School's first Principal, served for 24 years and devised the school's motto "Scientia est Potestas" (Knowledge is Power) whilst overseeing the establishment of the house system in the patriotic days of the Second World War. Waddle's successor, Mr Barnes, served for scarcely a year before dying in office, and between 1947 and 1960 the post was held by a further three relatively short term Principals: Dr Watkin; Mr Copeman and Mr Cafferky. During the ensuing "Lockie Years" the school underwent massive expansions, growing from 1091 students in 1961 to 2183 in 1967, as well as consolidating its reputation as being highly competitive amongst the private school institutions of South-East Queensland. The headmastership of David Sutton (1998–2008) witnessed a revival in ceremony and tradition coupled with continual academic improvement. For the 6 years from 2003–2008, then to 2012, the OP results consistently climbed, with 86% of students receiving an OP of 1–15 in 2008, and nearly 95% of students in 2012 received an OP of 1–15. Sutton's successor, Richard Morrison, reformed the selection process for academic-merit entrants, introduced the 'Aspire' program and led the re-branding of the school. Mr Wade Haynes, a former Acting Principal of the school, was his successor.

BSHS has been a member of the Great Public Schools Association of Queensland (GPS) since 1930, and of the Queensland Girls' Secondary Schools Sports Association (QGSSSA) since 1921.

Principals

The following principals have led the school since it was opened:

Mea. Bryden; 1913–1915
Unspecified position from 1916–1919
Isaac Waddle; 1920–1945
J. A. Barnes; 1945–1946
Herbert G. Watkin; 1947–1951
A. B. Copeman; 1952–1957
F. H. R. Cafferky; 1958–1960
George W. Lockie; 1961–1971
Raymond F. Fitzgerald; 1972–1981
Colin R. Mason; 1981–1997
David F. Sutton; 1998–2008
Richard C. Morrison; 2009–2011
Wade Haynes; 2011–present

Extracurricular activities

GPS membership

Brisbane State High School joined the Great Public Schools' Association of Queensland in 1930, and consequently the school is able to enter competitions against other GPS schools in South East Queensland. A wide range of activities are offered in the GPS including, Australian Rules Football, athletics, basketball, chess, cricket, cross country, debating, rowing, rugby union, soccer, swimming, tennis, volleyball. 
Brisbane State High's Queensland Great Public Schools (GPS) premierships include:

GPS premierships

GPS sport

Rugby

In 2009, the BSHS first XV rugby union team went undefeated in the season scoring a total of 405 points for (50.63 per game) and conceding a total of 85 points against (10.63 per game) from 8 season game. The team broke the GPS record when the school beat Brisbane Grammar School 103-0. The match was soon abandoned when the referee called for the use of the 'surrender rule' with 7 minutes still permitted to play. This First XV has been regarded by many as the best GPS rugby team in Australia from this decade. Two other players are representing the Australian A School boys team. This equalled the feats of the class of 2007, when two players represented the Australian schoolboys Rugby Union team while two others represented Australia A. Another two boys represented the Australian schoolboys rugby league team.

As of 2016 Brisbane State High School has the second most Australian Schoolboy Rugby caps in Queensland at 60.

QGSSSA sport

A wide range of sporting and other similar activities are offered Queensland Girls' Secondary Schools' Sports Association competitions, including Australian Rules Football, athletics, badminton, basketball, cricket, cross country, rowing, soccer, swimming, tennis, volleyball, rhythmic gymnastics, field hockey, netball, softball, touch football, waterpolo, and fencing.

QGSSSA premierships

Cultural

Performing arts

There are numerous strings orchestras in the school including the River, Southbank, Merivale, Cordelia and Symphony Orchestras. There are also multiple bands – the Wind Ensemble, Wind Band, Concert Band, Concert Winds, Wind Orchestra, and Symphonic Band. In addition to these, students can participate in many chamber groups and ensembles including Percussion Ensembles 1 and 2, Stage Band, Big Band, Flute Ensembles, Clarinet Ensembles, and Brass Ensembles. The Symphonic Band, Symphony Orchestra and Big Band also attend annual band camps with various workshops, sectionals and rehearsals. The Junior and Senior Dance Troupes are also offered. In 2016, the Senior Dance Troupe won the School Troupe National Champions title at the 2016 DanceLife Unite National Finals in Sydney. Regular school musicals and drama nights provide the opportunity for drama students to showcase their talents. The school consistently performs exceedingly well in these fields, with the Symphony Orchestra coming first in Australia in Fanfare 2005 held in Melbourne, and first in Queensland in 2007.  In 2010, this particular ensemble was awarded a platinum award for the fifth year in a row at Musicfest. In 2012, the Symphony Orchestra, conducted by Meg Robson, and the Symphonic Band, conducted by Brad Ruben, were two out of five state finalists in the statewide Fanfare competition. The Symphonic Band then went out to win the state title.

Debating

Brisbane State High School has been involved in the GPS, Queensland Debating Union (QDU), and Brisbane Girls’ Debating Association competitions. In 2019, the Brisbane State High School Senior A team won the QDU Senior A Grand Finals, and in 2020, the Brisbane State High School Senior A team were declared runner-ups in the same competition. Brisbane State High School has also had success in the Brisbane Girls Debating Association competition, having won both the Grade 10 and Grade 11 divisions of the competition in 2019. Students from Brisbane State High School are also involved in the selection process for the Queensland State Debating Team, with members of the Senior A team regularly reaching the Top 12 Training Squad for the State Team. Students from Brisbane State High School have also gone on to compete in the National Schools’ Debating Championships, as part of the Queensland State Debating Team - most recently in 2020 and 2021 where the State Team came in second place at the Championships.

Campus

The main campus

Two main campuses possessing a variety of architectural styles dominate the school's layout. The Upper Campus is the site of the school's original building and central administrative block constructed in 1920s brick architecture. The upper quadrangle extends out from this building with the library and the two storey computer block forming frontal wings. In addition, the Upper Campus houses the mathematics rooms, the science laboratories, the manual arts complex, sports facility, tennis courts and oval. An overpass walkway connects the Upper and Lower Campuses. H Block in the Lower Campus was constructed in 1864 as part of the South Brisbane Primary School and is a heritage-listed school building. J Block is predominantly used by the humanities department and the languages department, and M Block serves as a secondary administrative block, whilst the neighbouring K Block (demolished October 2009) was home to the performing arts. The space upon which it once stood is in the process of being converted into a formal entrance and car park. In 2008/09, massive redevelopment projects totaling $20.5 million saw the performing arts block moved to a new and larger facility at the other end of the Lower Campus. The gym within the sports complex is planned to be redeveloped within the next 4 years.

Fursden Road playing fields

Cricket, rugby and football are large users of the facilities, with games taking place on weekends and on various afternoons. A master plan has been put forward for a large development of Fursden Road which would include a new grandstand. It is believed that work on the development will commence in the next few years.

West End rowing sheds

The school maintains rowing sheds on the West End Reach of the Brisbane River, within close proximity of the rowing sheds of other GPS and BSRA (Brisbane SchoolGirls Rowing Association) member schools. Rowing boats, dingies and other necessary equipment are stored at the sheds and it is on that and other reaches of the river that training for the annual Head of the River rowing competition takes place.

House structure
Rather than being named after past students, the Houses are named in honour of army generals from the First World War.

Allenby House – Blue – Named after Viscount Edmund Allenby (1861–1936). British field marshal notable for commanding the Egyptian Expeditionary Force in the conquest of Palestine and Syria during the First World War.
Birdwood House – Red – Named after Field Marshal William Riddell Birdwood (1865–1951). British soldier who served in the Boer War and was known later on for providing overall command of the "Australian and New Zealand Army Corps" (ANZAC) throughout the battles of the Gallipoli Peninsula in the First World War.
Glasgow House – Gold – Named after Major-General Sir William Glasgow (1876–1955), a senior Australian officer at Gallipoli in 1915 who went on to command the First A.I.F Division with distinction in battles on the Somme as well as the final offensive of August 1918.
Monash House – Green – Named after General Sir John Monash (1865–1931). Served in the Gallipoli Campaign and later on in Flanders, commanding Australian forces at Messines Ridge, Passchendaele and in the battles of the Hindenburg Line.

School Council

Brisbane State High School has a School Council by reason of it being an Independent Public School, a class of school existing in Queensland. The Council monitors the school's progress in the implementation of its policies and assists the Principal in setting the school's strategic direction. Its members include representatives of the teaching staff, students, and the parents of students.

Past Students' Association

The Brisbane State High School Past Students' Association was formed in 1921, originally in two discrete entities as the Old Boys' and Old Girls' Associations. It now operates as an amalgamated body. The association's newsletter, Amicus, is mailed four times annually to all members. Contributions to projects geared towards promoting the tradition and spirit of the school are some of its primary functions. The current patron of the association is the school's eleventh principal, Mr Wade Haynes.

School museum

Founded in 1996 as a gift from that year's departing seniors, the museum contains documents, photographs and other memorabilia charting the school from its inception to its recent past. School badges and blazers from the 1920s and 1930s as well as originals of every school magazine are housed in the museum.

Notable alumni

See also
Education in Australia
Lists of schools in Queensland

References

External links

Brisbane State High School Discover Queensland Buildings website

Public high schools in Brisbane
Educational institutions established in 1921
1921 establishments in Australia
South Brisbane, Queensland
Great Public Schools Association of Queensland